The 23rd Chess Olympiad, organized by FIDE and comprising an open and a women's tournament, as well as several other events designed to promote the game of chess, took place between October 25 and November 12, 1978, in Buenos Aires, Argentina.

After the boycott two years earlier, the Eastern Bloc countries were back, including the Soviet team who, as usual, were huge favourites——but in the end they had to settle for the silver medal. Hungary, led by Lajos Portisch, caused quite an upset by taking the gold medals by a full point. The United States took the bronze.

This tournament also witnessed the debut of China, which placed 20th with six untitled players, and later became a chess power and won the Chess Olympiad in 2014 and 2018.

Open event
Sixty-five nations played a 14-round Swiss system tournament. To make for an even number of teams, the Argentine hosts also fielded a "B" team. In the event of a draw, the tie-break was decided first by using the Buchholz system, then by match points.

{| class="wikitable"
|+ Open event
! # !! Country !! Players !! Averagerating !! Points !! Buchholz
|-
| style="background:gold;"|1 ||  || Portisch, Ribli, Sax, Adorján, Csom, Vadász || 2570 || 37 ||
|-
| style="background:silver;"|2 ||  || Spassky, Petrosian, Polugaevsky, Gulko, Romanishin, Vaganian || 2620 || 36 ||
|-
| style="background:#cc9966;"|3 ||  || Kavalek, Browne, Lein, Byrne, Tarjan, Lombardy || 2553 || 35 ||
|-
| 4 ||  || Hübner, Unzicker, Pfleger, Darga, Hecht, Borik || 2540 || 33 || 
|-
| 5 ||  || Dzindzichashvili, Liberzon, Kagan, Bleiman, Birnboim, Gruenfeld || 2509 || 32½ || 442.5
|-
| 6 ||  || Gheorghiu, Ciocâltea, Ghițescu, Suba, Ghindǎ, Troianescu || 2468 || 32½ || 422.5
|-
| 7 ||  || Hamann, Jakobsen, Kristiansen, Fedder, Høi, Blom || 2416 || 32 || 440.5
|-
| 8 ||  || Schmidt, Kuligowski, Sznapik, Adamski, Pytel, Filipowicz || 2449 || 32 || 437.0
|-
| 9 ||  || Díez del Corral, Pomar, Calvo, Bellón López, Sanz Alonso, Rivas Pastor || 2429 || 32 || 430.5
|-
| 10 ||  || Korchnoi, Hug, Lombard, Wirthensohn, Huss, Bhend || 2484 || 32 || 426.0
|-
| 11 ||  || Hébert, Biyiasas, Day, Piasetski, Nickoloff, Coudari || 2388 || 32 || 422.5
|-
| 12 ||  || Miles, Stean, Keene, Hartston, Mestel, Nunn || 2508 || 31½ || 452.5
|-
| 13 ||  || Radulov, Ermenkov, Tringov, Padevsky, Spasov, Inkiov || 2486 || 31½ || 437.0
|-
| 14 ||  || Timman, Sosonko, Donner, Ree, Ligterink, Langeweg || 2538 || 31½ || 432.5
|-
| 15 ||  || Gligorić, Ljubojević, Matanović, Ivkov, Velimirović, Parma || 2558 || 31 || 438.0
|-
| 16 ||  || Andersson, Ornstein, Schneider, Kaiszauri, Schüssler, Wedberg || 2453 || 31 || 437.5
|-
| 17 ||  || Emma, Bronstein, Hase, Cámpora, Szmetan, Grinberg || 2409 || 31 || 418.0
|-
| 18 ||  || García González, Hernández, Rodríguez Céspedes, Vilela de Acuña, García Martínez, Lebredo Zarragoitia || 2486 || 30½ || 437.0
|-
| 19 ||  || Robatsch, Hölzl, Stoppel, Wittmann, Janetschek, Dür || 2389 || 30½ || 417.0
|-
| 20 ||  || Qi Jingxuan, Chen De, Liu Wenzhe, Liang Jinrong, Chang Tung Lo, Zhang Weida || 2273 || 30½ || 413.5
|-
| 21 ||  || Sisniega, Campos López, Villarreal, Aldrete, Escondrillas, Navarro || 2361 || 30½ || 393.5
|-
| 22 ||  || Westerinen, Rantanen, Hurme, Saren, Raaste, Kivipelto || 2389 || 30 || 421.0
|-
| 23 ||  || García, Gutierrez, Rodríguez, Zapata, de Greiff, Agudelo || 2359 || 30 || 400.5
|-
| 24 ||  || Torre E., Rodríguez, Mascariñas, Bordonada, Torre V., de Guzman || 2405 || 29½ || 407.0
|-
| 25 ||  || Sarapu, Chandler, Small, Stuart, Anderson, Weir || 2270 || 29½ || 396.0
|-
| 26 ||  || Suradiradja, Ardiansyah, Bachtiar, Wotulo, Sampouw, Kileng || 2346 || 29½ || 394.0
|-
| 27 ||  || Trois, van Riemsdijk, Segal, Braga, Másculo, Carvalho || 2355 || 29½ || 393.5
|-
| 28 ||  || Ólafsson F., Sigurjónsson, Ólafsson H., Pétursson, Árnason, Ásmundsson || 2480 || 29 || 423.0
|-
| 29 ||  || Donoso Velasco, Frias Pablaza, Morovic, Silva Sánchez, Scholz Solis, Cifuentes Parada || 2395 || 29 || 417.0
|-
| 30 ||  || Jamieson, Fuller, Shaw, Rogers, Woodhams, Viner || 2399 || 29 || 408.0
|-
| 31 ||  || Wibe, Helmers, Øgaard, Hoen, Johannessen, Heiberg || 2409 || 29 || 398.0
|-
| - ||  Argentina "B" || Giardelli, Seidler, Barbero, Braga, Bernat, Monier || 2329 || 28½ || 413.0
|-
| 32 ||  || Franco Ocampos, Gamarra Cáceres, Riego Prieto, Bogda, Ferreira, Ingolotti || 2278 || 28½ || 411.5
|-
| 33 ||  || Pritchett, Levy, Jamieson, Upton, Giulian, Reid || 2309 || 28 || 404.5
|-
| 34 ||  || Ostos, Fernández, Diaz, Gamboa, Dounia, González || 2253 || 28 || 401.5
|-
| 35 ||  || Arafeh, Hakki, Catalan, Khatib, Kassen M., Khattab || 2200 || 28 || 373.0
|-
| 36 ||  || Haïk, Giffard, Preissmann, Roos, Sellos, Letzelter || 2358 || 27½ || 425.0
|-
| 37 ||  || Estrada Degrandi, Dienavorian Lacherian, Silva Nazzari, Bademian Orchanian, Lamas Baliero, Pazdur González || 2270 || 27½ || 381.5
|-
| 38 ||  || Gonzáles, Delgado, Álvarez, Mateo, Pérez Nivar, Liao Yuan Eu || 2229 || 27½ || 380.5
|-
| 39 ||  || Weeramantry, Aturupane D. H. C., Goonetilleke, Parakrama || 2200 || 27½ || 373.5
|-
| 40 ||  || Jhunjhnuwala K., Valdellon, Kan Wai Shui, Jhunjhnuwala R., Schepel, Jhunjhnuwala N. || 2235 || 27½ || 367.0
|-
| 41 ||  || Cooper, Williams, Hutchings, Jones, Trevelyan, Tyrrell || 2324 || 27 || 403.5
|-
| 42 ||  || Rodríguez Vargas, González Bernal, Vásquez Horna, Vásquez, Pelaez Contti, Robbiano Taboada || 2271 || 27 || 399.5
|-
| 43 ||  || Broomes M., Broomes G., Wharton, Warsali, Brooms || 2200 || 27 || 369.0
|-
| 44 ||  || Takemoto, Matsumoto, Sakurai, Ozaki, Oda, Tanuma || 2200 || 27 || 359.0
|-
| 45 ||  || Stull, Schammo, Milbers, Kirsch, Welz, Philippe || 2219 || 27 || 353.0
|-
| 46 ||  || Jacobsen, Apol, Petersen, Ziska, Midjord, Durhuus || 2200 || 27 || 346.0
|-
| 47 ||  || Schumacher, Wostyn, Mollekens, Van Herck, Larsen, De Hert || 2223 || 26½ || 374.5
|-
| 48 ||  || De León, Batres, Canda, Grajeda, Garrido, Cruz Lorenzana || 2200 || 26½ || 358.0
|-
| 49 ||  || Chorfi, Al-Hamido, Arbouche, El-Amri, Khatib S., Bakali || 2200 || 26½ || 356.0
|-
| 50 ||  || Bouaziz, Belkadi, Tabbane, Kchouk, Hmadi, Zargouni || 2279 || 26 || 390.0
|-
| 51 ||  || Verduga, Pazos, Salvador, Freile, Frank, Márquez || 2266 || 26 || 381.5
|-
| 52 ||  || Chávez Chávez, Zarco Castillo, Mendivil, Alborta, Orestes, Palacios Alvarez || 2213 || 26 || 368.0
|-
| 53 ||  || Cecil Lee, Payne, Courtney Lee, Duchesne, Lum Tong, Chin Fong || 2200 || 26 || 356.5
|-
| 54 ||  || Arafat, Shoumali, Al-Mallah, Bakr, Haddad, Saqqa || 2200 || 26 || 327.5
|-
| 55 ||  || Wong S., Grant, Wong A., Powell || 2200 || 25½ || 
|-
| 56 ||  || Moraza Choisme, Freyre, Torres, Ochoa, Martínez Buitrago, Ferrao || 2214 || 25 || 373.0
|-
| 57 ||  || Tan Bian Huat, Woo Beng Keong, Hon Kah Seng, Liew Chee Meng, Foo Lum Choon, How || 2200 || 25 || 365.5
|-
| 58 ||  || Shabsh Abdulatif, El-Ageli, Tawengi, Isgeta, Talha, Aburziza M. || 2200 || 23½ || 321.0
|-
| 59 ||  || Bouasria, Radhy Sol, El-Mokhtar, Louly, Maouloud || 2200 || 23½ || 319.5
|-
| 60 ||  || Clua Ballague, Pantebre Martínez, Gómez Abad, Pantebre Martínez, Fité Barris, Vañó || 2200 || 22½ || 
|-
| 61 ||  || Van Tilbury, Hoyt, Grumer, Chiu Yum San, Hanno, John Turner || 2200 || 22 || 
|-
| 62 ||  Bermuda || Yerbury, Radford, Harris, Chudleigh, Dill, Lattyak || 2200 || 20½ || 
|-
| 63 ||  || De Vries, Ciezkowski, Merali, Biringanine || 2200 || 16 || 
|-
| 64 ||  || Hassan, Saleh, Abdulghafour, Abdul Rahman, Al-Kaitoob, Zainal || 2200 || 12½ || 328.5
|-
| 65 ||  || Hook, Georges, Pickering, Campbell, Downing || 2213 || 12½ || 327.5
|}

Team standing 

The following ratings were used to determine the placement (#).
 BP (sum of board points)
 TP (sum of team points)

{| class="wikitable"
!#||Team||Code||BP||TP||+||=||-||1||2||3||4||5||6||7||8||9||10||11||12||13||14
|-
| style="background:gold;"|1 || ||HUN||37||23||10||3||1||SCO3½||POL3||NED3||ESP2½||USA2||URS1½||DEN2||ENG3||BUL2½||GER2||ISL3||SWE3½||ISR2½||YUG3
|-
| style="background:silver;"|2 || ||URS||36||23||10||3||1||WLS3||ARG23½||ROM3||CUB3||ENG2||HUN2½||BUL2½||USA3||GER1½||ISR2||SWE2||POL2½||CAN3||NED2½
|-
| style="background:#cc9966;"|3 || ||USA||35||23||10||3||1||PAR3||AUT2½||CAN3||AUS3||HUN2||ENG2½||YUG2½||URS1||DEN4||CUB2½||GER2½||ISR2½||POL2||SUI2
|-
| 4 || ||GER||33||17||6||5||3||NZL4||CHI2½||CUB1||FIN3||DEN1½||SWE2||WLS4||ARG3||URS2½||HUN2||USA1½||YUG2||ENG2||ISR2
|-
| 5 || ||ISR||32½||18||7||4||3||ECU4||BRA2½||ESP1||CAN2½||PHI2||FRA2½||ROM2||FIN3||POL2½||URS2||CUB3½||USA1½||HUN1½||GER2
|-
| 6 || ||ROM||32½||16||6||4||4||PUR4||CAN1½||URS1||INA1½||CHN2½||TUN4||ISR2||BUL2||FRA2||ARG23||YUG1½||ISL3||ESP2||ENG2½
|-
| 7 || ||DEN||32||20||8||4||2||JPN3||MEX2½||COL3||YUG2||GER2½||CAN3½||HUN2||CUB2||USA0||SUI2½||ENG1||CHI3½||BUL2||AUT2½
|-
| 8 || ||POL||32||17||7||3||4||MAS3½||HUN1||HKG2½||BRA4||SWE2½||PHI2||ENG2½||YUG1½||ISR1½||FRA3||ESP2½||URS1½||USA2||CAN2
|-
| 9 || ||ESP||32||15||6||3||5||GUA4||VEN2½||ISR3||HUN1½||BUL1½||FIN2||FRA1½||AUS3½||SUI1½||AUT3||POL1½||CUB2||ROM2||SWE2½
|-
| 10 || ||SUI||32||19||8||3||3||BEL3||FRA1½||MEX2½||CHN2½||CHI3½||YUG1||BRA2½||SWE2||ESP2½||DEN1½||PHI3||ENG2||AUT2½||USA2
|-
| 11 || ||CAN||32||16||7||2||5||LBA4||ROM2½||USA1||ISR1½||SCO3½||DEN½||DOM3½||CHI2||ENG1||PER3||PAR2½||FRA4||URS1||POL2
|-
| 12 || ||ENG||31½||15||6||3||5||DOM4||COL3½||ARG2½||BUL2½||URS2||USA1½||POL1½||HUN1||CAN3||SWE1½||DEN3||SUI2||GER2||ROM1½
|-
| 13 || ||BUL||31½||16||7||2||5||LUX4||INA3||FRA2½||ENG1½||ESP2½||CUB3||URS1½||ROM2||HUN1½||ISL1||ARG3||NED1½||DEN2||FIN2½
|-
| 14 || ||NED||31½||17||7||3||4||URU4||FIN3||HUN1||ARG2½||CUB1||COL2||SWE1½||CHN2||PAR2½||BRA3||ARG23||BUL2½||YUG2||URS1½
|-
| 15 || ||YUG||31||18||7||4||3||TUN3½||AUS2½||NOR2½||DEN2||FRA2||SUI3||USA1½||POL2½||CUB1½||ARG2½||ROM2½||GER2||NED2||HUN1
|-
| 16 ||  ||SWE||31||17||7||3||4||HKG3||NOR1½||BEL3½||CHI2½||POL1½||GER2||NED2½||SUI2||CHN3½||ENG2½||URS2||HUN½||FIN2½||ESP1½
|-
| 17 || ||ARG||31||16||8||0||6||BOL3||CHN3½||ENG1½||NED1½||COL2½||INA3||ISL2½||GER1||PER3||YUG1½||BUL1||AUT1||NOR2½||VEN3½
|-
| 18 || ||CUB||30½||17||7||3||4||PER2½||MAR4||GER3||URS1||NED3||BUL1||PHI3||DEN2||YUG2½||USA1½||ISR½||ESP2||ISL2½||CHN2
|-
| 19 || ||AUT||30½||15||7||1||6||GUY2½||USA1½||SCO2½||NZL1½||PAR2||CHN½||HKG3||MAS3½||AUS4||ESP1||FIN2½||ARG3||SUI1½||DEN1½
|-
| 20 || ||CHN||30½||15||6||3||5||ISL3||ARG½||DOM3½||SUI1½||ROM1½||AUT3½||FIN2||NED2||SWE½||VEN1½||TUN2½||SYR2½||ECU4||CUB2
|-
| 21 || ||MEX||30½||16||7||2||5||TRI3||DEN1½||SUI1½||URU3||VEN1½||PAR1||PUR3||PER1||DOM2½||NOR2||BOL3||ECU3||COL2||ISL2½
|-
| 22 || ||FIN||30||14||6||2||6||JAM4||NED1||ARG22½||GER1||PER3||ESP2||CHN2||ISR1||NZL3||COL3||AUT1½||VEN3||SWE1½||BUL1½
|-
| 23 || ||COL||30||15||5||5||4||UAE4||ENG½||DEN1||HKG4||ARG1½||NED2||SCO2½||NOR3||ISL2||FIN1||CHI2||PHI2½||MEX2||BRA2
|-
| 24 || ||PHI||29½||16||6||4||4||AND2||PER2½||WLS3½||ISL2½||ISR2||POL2||CUB1||INA2½||ARG21½||CHI2½||SUI1||COL1½||SCO3||NZL2
|-
| 25 || ||NZL||29½||15||7||1||6||GER0||SRI3||LUX3½||AUT2½||INA1½||BRA1½||MAS3½||ARG22||FIN1||TUN2½||ECU1||JPN3½||PER3||PHI2
|-
| 26 || ||INA||29½||14||6||2||6||ZAI4||BUL1||CHI1½||ROM2½||NZL2½||ARG1||VEN2½||PHI1½||NOR1||ECU2||SCO1½||GUA4||AUS2||PAR2½
|-
| 27 || ||BRA||29½||14||6||2||6||IVB4||ISR1½||VEN2½||POL0||TUN3||NZL2½||SUI1½||WLS2½||CHI1½||NED1||AUS2||BOL4||PAR1½||COL2
|-
| 28 || ||ISL||29||13||6||1||7||CHN1||JPN4||PAR3||PHI1½||AUS2½||VEN3||ARG1½||FRA2½||COL2||BUL3||HUN1||ROM1||CUB1½||MEX1½
|-
| 29 || ||CHI||29||14||5||4||5||SRI4||GER1½||INA2½||SWE1½||SUI½||SCO2||JAM4||CAN2||BRA2½||PHI1½||COL2||DEN½||ARG22½||AUS2
|-
| 30 || ||AUS||29||15||6||3||5||ISV3½||YUG1½||FAI3½||USA1||ISL1½||NOR2½||PAR2½||ESP½||AUT0||SRI4||BRA2||ARG22½||INA2||CHI2
|-
| 31 || ||NOR||29||14||6||2||6||BER3½||SWE2½||YUG1½||FRA1||ECU3||AUS1½||ARG22||COL1||INA3||MEX2||VEN1½||PAR2½||ARG1½||WLS2½
|-
| - ||  Argentina "B"||ARG2||28½||12||5||2||7||JOR4||URS½||FIN1½||PAR2||WLS1½||SYR4||NOR2||NZL3||PHI2½||ROM1||NED1||AUS1½||CHI1½||FRA2½
|-
| 32 || ||PAR||28½||12||5||2||7||USA1||AND4||ISL1||ARG22||AUT2||MEX3||AUS1½||VEN3||NED1½||WLS2½||CAN1½||NOR1½||BRA2½||INA1½
|-
| 33 || ||SCO||28||14||6||2||6||HUN½||MAS3½||AUT1½||GUY4||CAN½||CHI2||COL1½||DOM2||ECU1½||URU2½||INA2½||WLS2½||PHI1||PER2½
|-
| 34 || ||VEN||28||13||6||1||7||MAU4||ESP1½||BRA1½||ECU2||MEX2½||ISL1||INA1½||PAR1||PUR3½||CHN2½||NOR2½||FIN1||FRA3||ARG½
|-
| 35 || ||SYR||28||13||6||1||7||FRA0||URU1½||BOL2½||BER3½||DOM1½||ARG20||LUX3||SRI2||TUN1½||MAR3||PUR3½||CHN1½||WLS1½||TRI3
|-
| 36 || ||FRA||27½||12||5||2||7||SYR4||SUI2½||BUL1½||NOR3||YUG2||ISR1½||ESP2½||ISL1½||ROM2||POL1||PER3½||CAN0||VEN1||ARG21½
|-
| 37 || ||URU||27½||15||5||5||4||NED0||SYR2½||MAU4||MEX1||BOL2||MAS1||SRI2||GUY2½||FAI2||SCO1½||GUA2½||DOM2½||TUN2||HKG2
|-
| 38 || ||DOM||27½||14||5||4||5||ENG0||UAE3½||CHN½||MAR3||SYR2½||BOL3½||CAN½||SCO2||MEX1½||TRI2||WAL22||URU1½||GUY3||SRI2
|-
| 39 || ||SRI||27½||13||3||7||4||CHI0||NZL1||MAS2||GUA1½||AND3½||MAU2||URU2||SYR2||JAM4||AUS0||FAI3½||TUN2||LUX2||DOM2
|-
| 40 || ||HKG||27½||12||5||2||7||SWE1||BER4||POL1½||COL0||TRI3||JAM1||AUT1||JPN3½||WLS1||BOL0||UAE4||MAS3½||BEL2||URU2
|-
| 41 || ||WLS||27||13||6||1||7||URS1||TRI3||PHI½||BEL3½||ARG22½||ECU3||GER0||BRA1½||HKG3||PAR1½||DOM2||SCO1½||SYR2½||NOR1½
|-
| 42 || ||PER||27||11||5||1||8||CUB1½||PHI1½||TUN2||FAI3½||FIN1||PUR2½||GUY3½||MEX3||ARG1||CAN1||FRA½||TRI3½||NZL1||SCO1½
|-
| 43 || ||GUY||27||12||6||0||8||AUT1½||FAI½||AND4||SCO0||LUX1½||MAR4||PER½||URU1½||BEL2½||GUA1||JOR2½||BER4||DOM1||TUN2½
|-
| 44 || ||JPN||27||16||7||2||5||DEN1||ISL0||ISV2½||TRI2||MAU1||JOR2½||GUA2½||HKG½||ZAI4||LBA3||LUX2||NZL½||JAM2½||PUR3
|-
| 45 || ||LUX||27||15||6||3||5||BUL0||ZAI3||NZL½||JAM2||GUY2½||FAI1||SYR1||MAR2½||AND3||JOR2½||JPN2||BEL1½||SRI2||IVB3½
|-
| 46 || ||FAI||27||12||5||2||7||MAR2||GUY3½||AUS½||PER½||MAS1||LUX3||BEL2½||ECU1½||URU2||PUR1½||SRI½||IVB4||LBA1½||ZAI3
|-
| 47 || ||BEL||26½||12||4||4||6||SUI1||BOL3||SWE½||WLS½||MAR1½||BER3½||FAI1½||TRI2||GUY1½||MAS2||JAM3||LUX2½||HKG2||GUA2
|-
| 48 || ||GUA||26½||14||6||2||6||ESP0||MAU1||LBA2½||SRI2½||PUR1½||TRI2½||JPN1½||JAM2||MAS2½||GUY3||URU1½||INA0||UAE4||BEL2
|-
| 49 || ||MAR||26½||14||6||2||6||FAI2||CUB0||JAM2½||DOM1||BEL2½||GUY0||LBA2½||LUX1½||BER3½||SYR1||ZAI4||PUR2½||BOL1½||ECU2
|-
| 50 || ||TUN||26||12||4||4||6||YUG½||ISV3||PER2||JOR4||BRA1||ROM0||ECU2||BOL2½||SYR2½||NZL1½||CHN1½||SRI2||URU2||GUY1½
|-
| 51 || ||SCU||26||14||5||4||5||ISR0||IVB3||PUR4||VEN2||NOR1||WLS1||TUN2||FAI2½||SCO2½||INA2||NZL3||MEX1||CHN0||MAR2
|-
| 52 || ||BOL||26||12||5||2||7||ARG1||BEL1||SYR1½||UAE4||URU2||DOM½||MAU2½||TUN1½||TRI2½||HKG4||MEX1||BRA0||MAR2½||JAM2
|-
| 53 || ||TRI||26||10||3||4||7||MEX1||WLS1||JOR2||JPN2||HKG1||GUA1½||ISV3½||BEL2||BOL1½||DOM2||AND3½||PER½||IVB3½||SYR1
|-
| 54 || ||BOL||26||14||5||4||5||ARG20||JAM2||TRI2||TUN0||BER2½||JPN1½||IVB2½||AND2||MAU3½||LUX1½||GUY1½||LBA2½||ZAI2||ISV2½
|-
| 55 || ||JAM||25½||12||4||4||6||FIN0||JOR2||MAR1½||LUX2||ZAI3½||HKG3||CHI0||GUA2||SRI0||IVB3½||BEL1||UAE3½||JPN1½||BOL2
|-
| 56 || ||PUR||25||12||6||0||8||ROM0||LBA3||ECU0||ISV4||GUA2½||PER1½||MEX1||MAU4||VEN½||FAI2½||SYR½||MAR1½||MAS3||JPN1
|-
| 57 || ||MAS||25||12||5||2||7||POL½||SCO½||SRI2||LBA3½||FAI3||URU3||NZL½||AUT½||GUA1½||BEL2||ISV3||HKG½||PUR1||UAE3½
|-
| 58 || ||LBA||23½||10||4||2||8||CAN0||PUR1||GUA1½||MAS½||ISV2||ZAI2||MAR1½||IVB2½||UAE3½||JPN1||BER1½||JOR1½||FAI2½||AND2½
|-
| 59 || ||MAU||23½||13||5||3||6||VEN0||GUA3||URU0||AND2½||JPN3||SRI2||BOL1½||PUR0||JOR½||UAE2||IVB3||ZAI3||ISV1||BER2
|-
| 60 || ||AND||22½||10||3||4||7||PHI2||PAR0||GUY0||MAU1½||SRI½||IVB3||UAE3½||JOR2||LUX1||ZAI3||TRI½||ISV2||BER2||LBA1½
|-
| 61 || ||ISV||22||9||3||3||8||AUS½||TUN1||JPN1½||PUR0||LBA2||UAE3||TRI½||ZAI2½||IVB2||BER1½||MAS1||AND2||MAU3||JOR1½
|-
| 62 ||  Bermuda||BER||20½||11||4||3||7||NOR½||HKG0||IVB3½||SYR½||JOR1½||BEL½||ZAI2||UAE2½||MAR½||ISV2½||LBA2½||GUY0||AND2||MAU2
|-
| 63 || ||ZAI||16||5||1||3||10||INA0||LUX1||UAE1||IVB3||JAM½||LBA2||BER2||ISV1½||JPN0||AND1||MAR0||MAU1||JOR2||FAI1
|-
| 64 || ||UAE||12½||5||2||1||11||COL0||DOM½||ZAI3||BOL0||IVB2½||ISV1||AND½||BER1½||LBA½||MAU2||HKG0||JAM½||GUA0||MAS½
|-
| 65 || ||IVB||12½||1||0||1||13||BRA0||ECU1||BER½||ZAI1||UAE1½||AND1||JOR1½||LBA1½||ISV2||JAM½||MAU1||FAI0||TRI½||LUX½
|}

Individual medals
 Board 1:  Viktor Korchnoi 9/11 = 81.8%
 Board 2:  Adam Kuligowski 10/13 = 76.9%
 Board 3:  Georgi Tringov 8½/11 = 77.3%
 Board 4:  Glenn Bordonada 7/9 = 77.8%
 1st reserve:  James Tarjan 9½/11 = 86.4%
 2nd reserve:  John Turner 6½/7 = 92.9%

Women's event 
Thirty-two nations took part in the women's Olympiad. From four preliminary groups the teams were split into four finals. In the event of a draw, the tie-break was decided first by match points, then by using the Sonneborn-Berger system.

The Soviet team was back, and led by newly crowned world champion Chiburdanidze they secured the gold medals in a superior display, as well as all four individual board prizes. On the reserve board, Akhmilovskaya won all of her ten games, the only perfect score in Olympiad history. Hungary and West Germany took silver and bronze, respectively.

Preliminaries
 Group 1: 

 Group 2: 

 Group 3: 

 Group 4:

Finals
{| class="wikitable"
|+ Final A
! # !! Country !! Players !! Averagerating !! Points !! MP !! S-B
|-
| style="background:gold;"|1 ||  || Chiburdanidze, Gaprindashvili, Alexandria, Akhmilovskaya || 2370 || 16 ||  || 
|-
| style="background:silver;"|2 ||  || Verőci-Petronić, Ivánka, Makai, Kas || 2260 || 11 || 8 || 43.00
|-
| style="background:#cc9966;"|3 ||  || Laakmann, Fischdick, Hund, Weichert || 2143 || 11 || 8 || 37.50
|-
| 4 ||  || Marković, Maček, Pihajlić, Prokopović || 2197 || 11 || 7 ||
|-
| 5 ||  || Ereńska-Radzewska, Szmacińska, Jurczyńska, Wiese  || 2147 || 10½ || || 
|-
| 6 ||  || García Vicente, Ferrer Lucas, García Padrón, Cuevas Rodríguez  || 2043 || 8½ || 6 ||
|-
| 7 ||  || Lemachko, Krumova, Shikova, Asenova  || 2175 || 8½ || 4 ||
|-
| 8 ||  || Miles, Jackson, Caldwell, Pritchard  || 2130 || 7½ ||  ||
|}

{| class="wikitable"
|+ Final B
! # !! Country !! Players !! Averagerating !! Points !! MP
|-
| 9 ||  || Borisova, Dahlin, Bengtsson, Cramling  || 2072 || 15 || 13
|-
| 10 ||  || Polihroniade, Baumstark, Mureșan, Nuțu  || 2183 || 15 || 11
|-
| 11 ||  || van der Mije, Vreeken, van Parreren, Belle  || 2140 || 10 || 
|-
| 12 ||  || Soppe, Arias, Justo, Cazón  || 1953 || 9½ || 7
|-
| 13 ||  || Merlini, Tagnon, Ruck-Petit, Warkentin  || 1935 || 9½ || 4
|-
| 14 ||  || Savereide, Haring, Herstein, Teasley  || 2110 || 9 || 
|-
| 15 ||  || Khadilkar R., Khadilkar J., Khadilkar V.  || 1800 || 8½ || 
|-
| 16 ||  || Pope, Kellner, McGrath, Depasquale  || 1975 || 7½ || 
|}

{| class="wikitable"
|+ Final C
! # !! Country !! Players !! Averagerating !! Points !! MP !! S-B
|-
| 17 ||  || Høiberg, Haahr, Larsen || 1967 || 13 || 9 || 42.25
|-
| 18 ||  || Shterenberg, Day, Baltgailis || 1907 || 13 || 9 || 41.25
|-
| 19 ||  || Guggenberger, Patiño, Gómez, Zapata || 1880 || 12 ||  || 
|-
| 20 ||  || Cardoso, Simonsen, Assunção, Snitkowsky || 1807 || 11½ || 9 || 
|-
| 21 ||  || Vuorenpää-Landry, Palasto, Pihlajamäki, Ristoja || 1893 || 11½ || 8 || 
|-
| 22 ||  || Houstoun, Hindle, Elder, McGhee || 1813 || 1 ||  || 
|-
| 23 ||  || Watai, Takahashi, Nakagawa, Shibuta || 1802 || 6½ ||  || 
|-
| 24 ||  || Maurá Denis, Camps de Ocampo, Escondrillas, Salazar || 1800 || 5½ ||  || 
|}

{| class="wikitable"
|+ Final D
! # !! Country !! Players !! Averagerating !! Points !! MP !! S-B
|-
| 25 ||  || Garwell, Evans, Brunker, Watkins || 1880 || 17½ ||  || 
|-
| 26 ||  || Torsteinsdóttir, Tráinsdóttir, Norðdahl, Samúelsdóttir || 1800 || 13½ ||  || 
|-
| 27 ||  || García La Rosa, Casique, Arteaga, Niño del Táchira || 1800 || 12 ||  || 
|-
| 28 ||  || Arias M., Zubieta S., Zubieta A. M., Arias D. || 1800 || 10½ || 7 || 34.25
|-
| 29 ||  || De los Santos, Villar de Armas, Ferrari Frei, Fernández Lares || 1800 || 10½ || 7 || 26.00
|-
| 30 ||  || Foster, Stretch, Barrowman, Davies || 1800 || 10½ || 7 || 25.25
|-
| 31 ||  || Fässler, Santoy, Haumeder, Fleureau || 1800 || 5½ ||  || 
|-
| 32 ||  || Castellón de Santana, Rodríguez Ramírez, Paniagua Torres, Landrau Laureano || 1800 || 4 ||  || 
|}

Final «A»

Final «B»

Final «C»

Final «D»

Individual medals
 Board 1:  Maia Chiburdanidze 9/11 = 81.8%
 Board 2:  Nona Gaprindashvili 9½/11 = 86.4%
 Board 3:  Nana Alexandria 8/10 = 80%
 Reserve:  Elena Akhmilovskaya 10/10 = 100%

References

23rd Chess Olympiad: Buenos Aires 1978 OlimpBase

23
Women's Chess Olympiads
Olympiad 23
Chess Olympiad 23
Olympiad 23
Chess Olympiad 23
1970s in Buenos Aires
International chess competitions hosted by Argentina
October 1978 sports events in South America
November 1978 sports events in South America